Stewart State Forest is a state forest in Orange County, New York, United States. It is located West of Stewart International Airport and North of Rock Tavern. It comprises a mix of wetlands, fields and forest.

Activities include hiking, biking, horseback riding, hunting, cross country skiing, snowmobiling, bird watching and fishing.

Wildlife includes white-tailed deer, coyotes, bobcats, wild turkeys, great blue herons and hawks.

History
Most of Stewart State Forest land was formerly in farm or residential use. It was acquired in the 1970s by the Metropolitan Transportation Authority (MTA) in order to establish and develop Stewart International Airport.

In March 1999, New York State Governor George Pataki announced the effective transfer of 5,200 acres from the Department of Transportation (DOT) to the Department of Environmental Conservation (DEC) in order to permanently preserve the land. Another 1,600 acres were transferred in June 2006.

References

External links
  Map and photographs of the state forest's trail system.

New York (state) state forests
Newburgh, New York
New Windsor, New York